Alison Bell (born 5 September 1984) is a Scottish female field hockey player who plays for the Scotland women's national field hockey team. She has represented Scotland in few international competitions including the 2005 Women's Hockey Junior World Cup, 2013 Women's EuroHockey Nations Championship, 2010 Commonwealth Games, and 2014 Commonwealth Games.

She also pursued her PhD in sports coaching from the University of Stirling in early 2012.

References

External links
 
 

1984 births
Living people
Scottish female field hockey players
Field hockey players at the 2010 Commonwealth Games
Field hockey players at the 2014 Commonwealth Games
Commonwealth Games competitors for Scotland
Alumni of the University of Stirling